Croesyceiliog Association Football Club is a football club playing in Croesyceiliog, Cwmbran, Wales. The team play in the Ardal Leagues South East, tier 3 of the Welsh football pyramid. The club was formed in 1964 as a youth team for pupils of Croesyceiliog School. It later entered a senior team in the Newport and District Football League and reached the Welsh Football League for the first time in 2004.

History
Croesyceiliog was formed in 1964 by pupils at Croesyceiliog School after they reached an agreement with the school for the use of its sporting facilities. The club was initially formed as a youth team and joined the under-18 division of the Newport and District Football League the same year andater merged with Cwmbran Wanderers. The team entered a team in the senior league for the first time the following season, joining Division 2B of the Newport and District League. For the 1967–68 season, the league launched the Premier Division, of which Croesyceiliog became a founder member.

The club won the First Division of the Gwent County League during the 2001–02 season but were not promoted. The team achieved the feat again two seasons later and were subsequently promoted to the Welsh Football League for the first time in the club's history after finishing the campaign unbeaten. Croesyceiliog enjoyed early success in the Welsh Football League, winning consecutive promotions in its first two season to reach the First Division. The club suffered relegation to the Second Division in the 2008–09 season.

During the club's history, four players have gone on to play professionally in the English Football League: Terry Cooper, Andy Dibble, Glyn Garner and Christian Doidge.

Honours

Welsh Football League Division Two
Runners-up: 2005–06
Welsh Football League Division Three
Runners-up: 2004–05
Gwent County League
Division One – Champions: 2001–02, 2003–04
Monmouthshire/Gwent Senior Cup
Winners (4): 1985–86, 1986–87, 2002–03, 2006–07
Monmouthshire/Gwent Amateur Cup
Winners (2): 1975–76, 2003–04

Club Officials

Ground

The club is based at Woodland Road in Croesyceiliog, Cwmbran.

1st Team (Ardal Leagues South East)

Squad

As of 1st July 2020

The Development Squad

Squad

Coaching Staff

Youth System

Squad

Coaching Staff

Miscellaneous

Notable former players

  Terry Cooper

  Andy Dibble

  Glyn Garner

  Christian Doidge

References

External links
 

Football clubs in Wales
Association football clubs established in 1964
Sport in Monmouthshire
1964 establishments in Wales
Cwmbran
Gwent County League clubs
Welsh Football League clubs
Ardal Leagues clubs
Newport and District League clubs